In ancient Rome prisons would often be used as areas to hold prisoners until they faced punishment. Prisoners would be treated horribly, although during the later parts of the history of the empire Christian charity could help improve the lives of prisoners somewhat. Prisons would be filthy, underground, and hot. Often times prisoners would be tortured into revealing information. This also served the ulterior motive of deterring crime. The ministers of the prisons were the Tresviri Capitales. Notable prisons in ancient Rome are the Mamertine prison and Ergastulum.

Tresviri Capitales 
The Tresviri Capitales were a group of three officials that administrate and guàrds of the prisons. The Tresviri Capitales had complete criminal jurisdiction over Roman citizens. They also had jurisdiction over slaves. The Tresviri Capitales might have also just been regular judicial officials.

Prisons

Known prisons 
The first Roman prison was built by Ancus Marcius and enlarged by Servius Tullius, another prison was built by Agrippa on the Campus Martius. The prison built by Agrippa was called the Porticus Argonautarum. There were other prisons in Rome, the only one of which that there are considerable ruins of is a prison built by Augustus and named after Octavia. The prison in Alba Fucens is described as dark, underground, and small. Ancient tablets describe a prison called the Ergastulum. There was an underground prison called the Mamertine prison. The state prison of Rome used to be the only prison needed.

Conditions and design 
The prisons were filthy, poorly ventilated, and were underground. The prisons would be divided into outer and inner areas. The inner parts of the prison were more secure and darker. Prison would not have had individual cells. They would have had groups of prisoners chained together in different rooms. Prisons would often times be very crowded. The prisons were designed to psychologically and physically torture a prisoner into confessing. Emperor Valens drafted a law which required the confession to be submitted in written form. The prisons would also be designed to strip the prisoner of dignity. There was very little rations in the prison, because friends and family were expected to supply the prisoners needs.  The Christian Church would provide charity to prisoners. Emperor Constantine regulated the amount of charity the Christians could provide. A Bishop would have the right to administer prisons according to Canon law. The presence of Christian priests in prisons reminded the guards to treat the prisoners well, although the prisoners still lived in horrible conditions. The prisoners were not segregated by gender, leading to other things.

Usage 
Prisons would be used to hold prisoners until trial. There was no such thing as being condemned to serve a sentence in prison. Although people would spend a lot of time in prison. During the Roman Empire Roman prisons were used mainly for holding prisoners condemned to death. Private prisons called Carcer Privatus would be used to hold debtors. There was a public prison called Custodia Publica which held people awaiting trial. Prisons were meant to be a fate worse than death, to discourage crime.

References 

Crime and punishment in ancient Rome
Rome